Malha Mall (Kanyon Malha), sometimes spelled Malcha Mall, also known as Jerusalem Mall (Kanyon Yerushalayim), is an indoor shopping mall in the southwestern neighbourhood of Malha, Jerusalem.

It is one of seven malls built in Israel by David Azrieli.

According to Gideon Avrami, director of the mall, the mall is popular among both Jewish and Arab shoppers. In 2010, there were 1,000-1,200 Palestinian visitors a day, accounting for three percent of all shoppers. On Muslim holidays and Sundays, the figure rose to 25 percent.

The mall is closed from Friday afternoon until Saturday evening out of respect for the Jewish Shabbat.

In 2011, Malha Mall was voted Israel's top mall by the Israeli financial newspaper Globes.

See also
 List of shopping malls in Israel
 Azrieli Center
 Jerusalem Sports Quarter

References

External links

Israel beyond the conflict
iTravelJerusalem - MALHA MALL: JERUSALEM'S BIGGEST SHOPPING CENTER
 Go Jerusalem - Jerusalem Azrieli Mall

Buildings and structures in Jerusalem
Shopping malls in Israel
Shopping malls established in 1993
Tourist attractions in Jerusalem
1993 establishments in Israel